Buddies in India is a 2017 Chinese action adventure comedy film directed by comedian and actor Wang Baoqiang, in his directorial debut, and also starring Wang.  It was released in China by Tianjin Maoyan Media, Beijing Enlight Pictures and Huaxia Film Distribution on January 28, 2017. This Film has Hindi songs in which lyrics have been written by the noted lyricist Alok Ranjan Jha and Music has been composed by Sunny Subramanian. Chinni Prakash choreographed the song sequence.

Plot
An acrobatic monkey loving circus guy accompanies son of a recently deceased CEO to India to recover his will. His uncle sends many thugs to eliminate them but by sheer luck and dedication of the acrobatic circus man, the young heir of the corporation escapes with his life. Reaching their destination point they understand the acrobat was a long lost son of the CEO's friend and he send his son to India with the aim to fulfill his promise to his friend who is staying in India.

Cast
 Wang Baoqiang as Sun Wukong
 Bai Ke as Tang Sanzang
 Yue Yunpeng as Zhu Bajie
 Ada Liu as Sha Wujing
 Vikramjeet Virk as Bull Demon King
 Liu Haoran as Erlang Shen
 Shruti Sodhi as Queen Iron Fan
 Liu Xiao Ling Tong as Wu Shen
 Justin Roiland as Bodhisattva Guanyin

Production
Principal photography was taking place in India in early May 2016. The movie is scheduled to be released on 28th Jan, 2017.

Vikramjeet Virk is the first Indian actor to play the character of the much-revered character of Bull King.

Indian studio Yash Raj Films was involved in line production, assisting with the film's shooting in India.

References

External links
 

Chinese action adventure films
Chinese action comedy films
2017 action comedy films
Beijing Enlight Pictures films
Films shot in India
2017 films
2010s Mandarin-language films
Tianjin Maoyan Media films
Huaxia Film Distribution films
2010s adventure comedy films
2017 directorial debut films
Films set in India
Films shot in Jaipur
Films shot in Rajasthan
Films set in Delhi